Bruce Breen (born 13 October 1961) is a Canadian rugby union player. He played in nine matches for the Canada national rugby union team from 1986 to 1993, including one match at the 1987 Rugby World Cup and one at the 1991 Rugby World Cup.

References

1961 births
Living people
Canadian rugby union players
Canada international rugby union players
Place of birth missing (living people)